The Castle Dome Mountains (Tolkepaya Yavapai: Wi:hopuʼ) are a mountain range in Yuma County, Arizona, within the Kofa National Wildlife Refuge. Castle Dome Peak, the high point of the range, is a prominent butte and distinctive landmark. Castle Dome was named by American soldiers at old Fort Yuma in the 1880s. Early Spanish explorers called the same peak Cabeza de Gigante, "Giant's Head."

History

Mining

The Castle Dome mining district is one of Yuma County's oldest and most productive mining locations. Its proximity to the Colorado River and relatively low rates of freight at the time permitted the mining of even low grades of ore which wouldn't have been profitable at other locations. In addition to silver and lead, the area is rich in numerous other minerals, including zinc, copper, gold, and many others.

Settlements
The area was home to the town and mining camp of Castle Dome based around the Castle Dome Mine which first produced silver and later lead. The post office opened in 1875 and closed in 1876. Castle Dome ghost town is now a museum site, the Castle Dome Mines Museum, with twenty or so restored period buildings.

Castle Dome Landing was the port and supply point nearby on the Colorado River. The townsite is now submerged beneath the Imperial Dam reservoir.

Mineral collecting
The Castle Dome mining district is a popular district for mineral collectors. The region is known for striking combinations of cerussite, fluorite, vanadinite, wulfenite, barite, and mimetite, as well as galenite and anglesite. The Hull Mine and Puzzler Mine in particular have produced atypical green vanadinite and mimetite as well as yellow-hued wulfenite.

References

External links

 Castle Dome ghost town museum photo gallery
 "Forgotten mining era revived", Arizona Republic article on Castle Dome ghost town
 Famous mineral localities: The Castle Dome District, Yuma County, Arizona. Summary -- US library card required for full article.
 Castle Dome Mines Museum & Ghost Town at Trip Advisor

Yuma Desert
Mountain ranges of the Sonoran Desert
Mountain ranges of the Lower Colorado River Valley
Mountain ranges of Yuma County, Arizona
Mountain ranges of Arizona